František Hanc (born 2 April 1974, in Prešov) is a Slovak football player.

Rodina:

External links 

Guardian's Stats Centre

1974 births
Living people
People from Snina
Sportspeople from the Prešov Region
Slovak footballers
Slovak expatriate footballers
Slovak football managers
FC Arsenal Kyiv players
FC Petržalka players
FC Borysfen Boryspil players
FC Karpaty Lviv players
FC VSS Košice players
SV Mattersburg players
ŠK Futura Humenné players
MFK Snina players
Slovak Super Liga players
Ukrainian Premier League players
Austrian Football Bundesliga players
Expatriate footballers in Ukraine
Expatriate footballers in Austria
Sportspeople from Prešov
Association football defenders